Rockingham Road was a football stadium in Kettering, Northamptonshire, England. It was home to Kettering Town F.C. from 1897 until 2011.

At the time of its closure, the ground had a capacity of 6,264, of which 1,800 was seated.

In September 2017, the land was sold by the owner, Ben Pickering Limited. The site was first identified as a potential site for housing in 2005 by the local authority, and press reports indicated that the new owner was likely to use the land for a housing development.

During November 2017, the entire stadium and associated structures were demolished and the site cleared for redevelopment.

Repossession
On 4 August 2011, Kettering Town Club moved into Nene Park after agreeing to a long-term-lease with the landlord.

On 19 December 2011, the ground was repossessed by bailiffs acting on behalf of the owner, Ben Pickering. A notice on the entry to the ground read, 

Despite football being no longer played at the grounds, its social club was still in use by the supporters-trust and was also being used for storage of club stock which is still there.

External links
Kettering Town – Rockinghan Road (archived)

References

Kettering Town F.C.
Defunct football venues in England
Sports venues in Northamptonshire
Kettering
Sports venues completed in 1897
Sports venues demolished in 2017